The 2021 Arizona Lottery 100 was a ARCA Menards Series West race held on November 6, 2021. It was contested over 100 laps on the  oval. It was the ninth and final race of the 2021 ARCA Menards Series West season. Joe Gibbs Racing driver Ty Gibbs won his second race of the season. Jesse Love clinched the 2021 ARCA Menards Series West championship in a tie-breaker with Jake Drew.

Background

Entry list 

 (R) denotes rookie driver.
 (i) denotes driver who is ineligible for series driver points.

Practice/Qualifying 
Practice and qualifying were combined into 1 90-minute session, where the fastest lap counted as the driver's qualifying lap.

Starting Lineups

Race

Race results

References 

2021 in sports in Arizona
Arizona Lottery 100
2021 ARCA Menards Series West